Jim Collins (1923–1996) was a footballer who played as an inside forward in the Football League for Barrow and Chester.

References

1923 births
1996 deaths
People from Colne
Association football inside forwards
English footballers
Derby County F.C. players
Barrow A.F.C. players
Chester City F.C. players
Winsford United F.C. players
English Football League players